Yaring is a district (amphoe) of Pattani province, southern Thailand. The Thai name is a corruption of the Malay Jaring (Jawi: جاريڠ).

Geography
Neighboring districts are (from the east clockwise): Panare, Mayo, Yarang, and Mueang Pattani. To the north is the Gulf of Thailand.

Administration
The district is divided into 18 sub-districts (tambons), which are further subdivided into 81 villages (mubans). There are three townships (thesaban tambons) in the district. Bang Pu covers tambon Bang Pu, Yaring parts of tambon Ya Mu, and Than Yong part of tambon Manang Yong. There are a further 13 tambon administrative organizations (TAO).

External links 
amphoe.com (in Thai)

Districts of Pattani province